Boris Konevega (born 6 August 1995) is a Belarusian professional footballer who plays for Niva Dolbizno.

Honours
Dinamo Brest
Belarusian Cup winner: 2016–17

External links 
 
 
 Profile at pressball.by

1995 births
Living people
Sportspeople from Brest, Belarus
Belarusian footballers
Association football midfielders
FC Dynamo Brest players
FC Volna Pinsk players
FC Rukh Brest players